Phlox is an unincorporated community in southern Union Township, Howard County, Indiana, United States.  It lies at the intersection of State Road 26 with County Road 1100 East.

Phlox is part of the Kokomo, Indiana Metropolitan Statistical Area.

Phlox is probably named after the local vegetation.

Geography

References

Unincorporated communities in Howard County, Indiana
Unincorporated communities in Indiana
Kokomo, Indiana metropolitan area